Joaquín Pérez (born 15 May 1937) is a Cuban rower. He competed in the men's coxless four event at the 1956 Summer Olympics.

References

External links
 

1937 births
Living people
Cuban male rowers
Olympic rowers of Cuba
Rowers at the 1956 Summer Olympics
Place of birth missing (living people)
20th-century Cuban people
21st-century Cuban people